Yijiacun Station is a station on Line 2 of the Hohhot Metro. It opened on 1 October 2020. The name literally translates to 'One Family Village'.

References 

Hohhot Metro stations
Railway stations in China opened in 2020